Kurt Georg Hoffmann (12 November 1890 – 1976) was a German rower. He competed at the 1912 Summer Olympics in Stockholm with the men's single sculls where he was eliminated in round one.

References

1890 births
1976 deaths
German male rowers
Olympic rowers of Germany
Rowers at the 1912 Summer Olympics
Rowers from Hamburg
European Rowing Championships medalists